The 1972–73 Boise State Broncos men's basketball team represented Boise State College during the 1972–73 NCAA University Division basketball season. The Broncos were led by eighth-year head coach Murray Satterfield, and played their home games on campus at Bronco Gymnasium in Boise, Idaho.

Satterfield resigned in mid-January when the Broncos were 6–8 (0–2 in Big Sky), and assistant Bus Connor was promoted.

No Broncos were named to the all-conference team.  There was no conference tournament, which debuted three years later in 1976.

References

External links
Sports Reference – Boise State Broncos – 1972–73 basketball season

Boise State Broncos men's basketball seasons
Boise State
Boise State